Rocky Hill is an unincorporated community in Barren County, in the U.S. state of Kentucky.

History
William Settles, Rifle Maker, founded Rocky Hill in 1798. A post office called Rocky Hill was established in 1825, and remained in operation until 1911. The community's name most likely is a transfer from Fauquier County, Virginia, the native home of a share of the early settlers.

References

Unincorporated communities in Barren County, Kentucky
Unincorporated communities in Kentucky